Charles Edward Haliburton (born April 23, 1938) is a jurist and former politician in the Canadian province of Nova Scotia.

Education and legal career
Haliburton graduated from Acadia University in 1959 with a Bachelor of Arts and then from Dalhousie University in 1962 with a Bachelor of Laws. He was appointed Queen's Counsel in 1978. Haliburton served as an Adjudicator for Small Claims Court, as both a provincial and federal Crown Prosecutor, and as Solicitor for the Municipality and the Town of Digby. He also served as Councilor and then as Mayor of the Town of Digby.

Haliburton returned to private practice after politics and was subsequently appointed to the bench in 1993. He retired from the Nova Scotia Supreme Court in 2013.

Political career
Haliburton was first elected to the House of Commons of Canada in the 1972 federal election as the Progressive Conservative Member of Parliament for South Western Nova. He lost his seat to Liberal challenger Coline Campbell in the 1974 federal election, but ran again in the renamed riding of South West Nova in the 1979 federal election that brought the Tories to power under Joe Clark after sixteen years of Liberal governance. He sat as a backbench supporter of Clark's minority government for seven months. Following the defeat of the Clark government in the House of Commons, another federal election was called in 1980, and Haliburton lost his seat in a rematch against Campbell.

Electoral record

References
 
 Justices of the Supreme Court of Nova Scotia

Specific

1938 births
Living people
Members of the House of Commons of Canada from Nova Scotia
Lawyers in Nova Scotia
Judges in Nova Scotia
Progressive Conservative Party of Canada MPs
Schulich School of Law alumni
People from Kings County, Nova Scotia